Rhyothemis resplendens, common name Jewel flutterer, is a species of dragonfly in the family Libellulidae.
The genus Rhyothemis extends from Africa to the western Pacific, with five species known in Australia. The species Rhyothemis resplendens has blue metallic reflecting panels on both wing sets, and inhabits streams, rivers and still waters on and adjacent to coastal Queensland, from around Mackay to the northern part of Cape York Peninsula. It is a small dragonfly with a wingspan of 40-60mm and body length around 25mm. To the north of Australia it is found in the Moluccas, New Guinea and the Bismarck Archipelago.
On the adult, markings on the hindwing are longer than those on the forewing. The taxon has been assessed for the IUCN Red List as being of least concern.

Gallery

See also
 List of Odonata species of Australia

References

Libellulidae
Odonata of Australia
Insects of Asia
Insects of New Guinea
Taxa named by Edmond de Sélys Longchamps
Insects described in 1878